The Chapel of St Peter-on-the-Wall, Bradwell-on-Sea, is a Christian church dating from the years 660-662 and among the oldest largely intact churches in England.  It is in regular use by the nearby Othona Community, in addition to Church of England services. It is a Grade I listed building

History

According to Bede (who wrote his history in the early 8th century), a 'city' named Ythanceaster existed on the River Penta. The Chapel of St Peter-on-the-Wall was almost certainly originally built by Bishop Cedd in 654. It was an Anglo-Celtic church for the East Saxons, set astride the ruins of the abandoned Roman fort of Othona. The current structure was most likely built around 654–662, incorporating the Roman bricks and stones. In 653 Cedd travelled south from Lindisfarne to spread Christianity at the behest of Sigeberht the Good, then King of the East Saxons, and, having been ordained as a bishop, returned the next year in order to build the Chapel, and probably others too. Following the death of Cedd in October 664 from plague, the Chapel became part of the Diocese of London.

No further record exists of the Chapel being used until 1442, when the local clergy reported to the Bishop of London that it had been expanded slightly, with a small tower above the porch with a bell in it. However they did not know of its origins and it was unusable, having been burnt. It was repaired and returned to regular use alongside the parish church in Bradwell-on-Sea until at least the Tudor period (16th century) before falling into disuse as a church again and being used as a barn—the position of the wide barn doorway, now filled in, can be seen on the south side of the nave.

In 1920 it was restored and reconsecrated as a chapel. It achieved Grade I listed status in 1959.

Current use
The Chapel belongs to Chelmsford Cathedral and is looked after by the Chaplain, the Revd Steven Poss, Rector of the parish church of St Thomas Bradwell-on-Sea, and members of the church. Regular public services are held in the chapel each week with a Thursday morning Communion service at 9am. Special services are held at Christmas and Easter. In the summer evening services are held each Sunday in July and August at 6:30pm.

The Chapel and adjacent field are the home of the Bradwell Pilgrimage, held on the first Saturday in July. The procession starts at the Parish Church of St Thomas and the pilgrims walk to the Chapel of St Peter's, where services and events are held.

The Chapel is also used by the nearby Othona Community. Founded in 1946 by Norman Motley, rector of St Michael, Cornhill, 1956-1980, this Christian-based community is open to people of all faiths and none.

In 2018 the Chapel was the location for two music videos by the boys' choir Libera.

Footnotes

References

Further reading

External links

 Information and a selection of photographs from the Anglo-Saxon Churches in England website.
 The chapel as depicted on the map series OS 25-inch 1892-1914 published by the National Library of Scotland.
 Information from Essex County Council about St Peter's Way, a long distance path through Essex to the Chapel.
 Information and illustrations of the chapel from An Inventory of the Historical Monuments in Essex, Volume 4, South east (London, 1923), published by British History Online.

654
7th-century church buildings in England
Bradwell-on-Sea
Bradwell-on-Sea
Bradwell-on-Sea
650s establishments
7th-century establishments in England